Meyers Lake is a lake in the U.S. state of Wisconsin.

A variant name is "Lake Meyers". The lake's name most likely is a corruption of the last name of Monroe Moyers, an early settler.

References

Lakes of Wisconsin
Bodies of water of Portage County, Wisconsin